The 1953–54 Hong Kong First Division League season was the 43rd since its establishment.

League table

References
1953–54 Hong Kong First Division table (RSSSF)

Hong Kong First Division League seasons
Hong
football